Shiro, Shirō, Shirow or Shirou may refer to:

People 
, leader of the Shimabara Rebellion
 Ken Shiro (born 1992), Japanese boxer
, Japanese football player 1923–1925
, Japanese composer
, Japanese weightlifter
, Japanese microbiologist and lieutenant general
, Japanese actor and comedian
, Japanese actor, known for the Super Sentai franchise
, Japanese artist
 Shiro Kashiwa (1912–1998), Attorney General of Hawaii from 1959
, Japanese admiral
, Japanese football player
, Japanese actor
, Japanese wrestler
, Japanese designer
, Japanese general at the Battle of Leyte
, Japanese fencer
, Japanese manga artist
, Japanese rower
, Japanese football player 1934
, Japanese manga artist
, Japanese enka singer
, Japanese car designer
 Shiro Oishi (born 1942), American judo practitioner and wrestler
, Japanese music producer and composer
, Japanese judo practitioner
, Japanese anime producer
, Japanese cross-country skier
, Japanese Christian minister
, Japanese television announcer
, Japanese author

Fictional characters 
 Kamui Shiro, the main character of X
 Shiro, mysterious albino girl in Deadman Wonderland
 Shiro, firearms-obsessed nephew in Samurai Cat
 Shiro, gamer in No Game No Life
 Shiro Amada, commander in Mobile Suit Gundam: The 08th MS Team
 Shirō Emiya, the main character in Fate/stay night media
 Shirou Kazami, the father of protagonist of Onegai Teacher
 Shirō Shimizu, young theology student in Jigoku
 Takashi 'Shiro' Shirogane, black paladin in Voltron: Legendary Defender
 Shiro Fujimoto, a character in Ao no Exorcist
 Shiro, is a supporting character in Sewayaki Kitsune no Senko-san
 Shiro Miyata, a character in the PlayStation 2 horror/stealth video game Forbidden Siren
 Shiro Kanzaki, a character and the main antagonist from the Tokusatsu TV series Kamen Rider Ryuki.
 Shiro Ogami, a character in the Revue Starlight franchise

Places 
 Shiro, Texas, an unincorporated community in Grimes County
 Shirou, Iran or Shur Ab, a village in Zanjan Province

Other uses 
 Shiro (food), an East African stew of chickpeas or broad bean meal
 Shiro (restaurant), in Ahakista, County Cork, Ireland
 Shiro Games, a French video game company
 Shiro, a mass of branches in the mycelium of a fungus
 Apache Shiro, a software security framework
 Japanese castle

See also 
 Siro (disambiguation)

Japanese masculine given names